A casado (Spanish, "married man") is a Costa Rican meal using rice, black beans, plantains, salad, a tortilla, and an optional protein source such as chicken, beef, pork, fish, and so on.

The term may have originated when restaurant customers asked to be treated as casados, since married men ate such meals at home. Another theory is that the rice and beans and/or the grouping of dishes are married, since they are always together.

References

Costa Rican cuisine